Metribuzin (4-amino-6-tert-butyl-3-(methylthio)-1,2,4-triazin-5(4H)-one) is a herbicide used both pre- and post-emergence in crops including soy bean, potatoes, tomatoes and sugar cane.

It acts by inhibiting photosynthesis by disrupting photosystem II. It is widely used in agriculture and has been found to contaminate groundwater.

Metribuzin is produced by reacting one mole of 4-amino-6-tert-butyl-3-mercapto-(1,2,4)triazin-5(4H)one and half a mole of dimethyl sulfonate which react at 57°C in presence of sulfuric acid media about 7 hours and transfer methyl (CH3) from triazine to metribuzin and product formed 1 mole of metribuzin and half mole of sulfuric acid and later neutralized with soda ash and then purified. 

MP=125°C, BP=132°C, and cause dust explosion if enough amount of energy absorbed by it.

References

External links 
 

Herbicides
Tert-butyl compounds
Conjugated ketones